Communist Party of Spain was founded in 1921 and as of 2017 is the third-largest political party in Spain.

Communist Party of Spain may also refer to:

 Communist Party of the Peoples of Spain
 Communist Party of Spain (8th and 9th Congresses), a splinter group that existed 1971–1980
 Communist Party of Spain (international), two different groups that existed 1967–1978:
 Party of Labour of Spain, named Communist Party of Spain (international) from 1967 to 1975
 Communist Party of Spain (international) (1975)
 Communist Party of Spain (Marxist-Leninist), founded in 2006
 Communist Party of Spain (Marxist-Leninist) (historical), a pro-Maoist and later pro-Albanian group that existed 1964–1992
 Communist Party of Spain (Reconstituted), founded in 1975, a mostly clandestine organization
 Communist Unification Party
 Libertarian Communist Party (Spain)
 Revolutionary Communist Party (Spain)
 Spanish Communist Party, 1920–1921
 Spanish Communist Workers' Party (1973)
 Spanish Communist Workers' Party (1921)
 Workers' Communist Party (Spain)
 Workers' Party of Spain–Communist Unity